Robert John Dodaro, OSA is an American priest of the Catholic Church. He is a specialist in the writings of St Augustine of Hippo.

Dodaro is a 1973 graduate of St. Augustine Seminary High School in Holland, Michigan.

Until 2016, he served as the President of the Patristic Institute Augustinianum in Rome, and until 2018 was on the faculty as a Professor of Theology. He was also a Professor of Patristic theology at the Pontifical Lateran University.

He also serves as the Co-Editor-in-Chief of the Augustinus-Lexikon, a Visitor of Ralston College, and on the Editorial Advisory Council of Dionysius. His Christ and the Just Society in the Thought of Augustine was published by Cambridge University Press in 2004, and he was a Co-Editor of Augustine: Political Writings, a collection of letters and sermons by Augustine that deal with political matters, and also of Augustine and His Critics, a collection of essays in honour of Gerald Bonner.

Pope Francis named him a member of the Study Commission on the Women's Diaconate on 2 August 2016.

See also
List of contemporary Augustinian scholars

References

External links
 Institutum Patristicum Augustinianum
 A Turn to the Fathers: An Interview with Fr Robert Dodaro

Living people
Patristic Institute Augustinianum
Villanova University alumni
Catholic Theological Union alumni
Alumni of the University of Oxford
Year of birth missing (living people)
Augustine studies